Kerrtown is a census-designated place located in Vernon Township, Crawford County, Pennsylvania, United States, at the intersection of U.S. Routes 6/19/322 and Pennsylvania Route 102, just west of the city of Meadville. At the 2010 census, the population was 305.

Demographics

References

External links

Census-designated places in Crawford County, Pennsylvania
Census-designated places in Pennsylvania